John William Tennant (3 August 1907 – 1978) was a footballer who played in the Football League for Bolton Wanderers, Liverpool, Torquay United and Stoke City.

Career
Tennant was born in Newcastle upon Tyne and played for his works team Washington Colliery before joining in 1926 Newcastle United but returned to the Colliery without making an appearance. Four years later he signed for Stoke City but played just once in 1930–31 which came in a 2–1 victory over Charlton Athletic on 25 October 1930. Tennant then spent the 1932–33 at Torquay United playing in all of the "Gulls" matches and impressed enough to earn a move to Liverpool.

He earned a reputation as a speedy left back at Anfield and it came as a surprise when he was sold to Bolton Wanderers in 1935 having just established himself in the side. He spent four years with Bolton making just over 100 appearances in the First Division and made a return to Stoke in 1938–39. He played 28 matches before World War II ended his career. During the war he guested for Liverpool, Southport and Wrexham.

Career statistics
Source:

References

1907 births
1978 deaths
Footballers from Newcastle upon Tyne
English footballers
Association football defenders
Washington F.C. players
Newcastle United F.C. players
Stoke City F.C. players
Torquay United F.C. players
Liverpool F.C. players
Bolton Wanderers F.C. players
English Football League players
Liverpool F.C. wartime guest players
Southport F.C. wartime guest players
Wrexham F.C. wartime guest players